Maksym Andriyevych Hramm (born 27 January 1991) is a Ukrainian football midfielder who plays with Toronto Falcons in the Canadian Soccer League

Club career

Ukraine 
Hramm was a product of Dnipro Dnipropetrivsk academy system. After failing to transition into the senior team he began his professional career in the Ukrainian Second League with Hirnyk Kryvyi Rih in 2009. Throughout his two-year tenure with Hirnyk, he appeared in 17 matches and recorded 1 goal.  

In 2012, he remained in the third tier to play with Krystal Kherson. In total, he would appear 26 matches for Kherson. Following his stint with Kherson, he would play at the amateur level with Lozuvatka Kryvyi Rih. In 2016, he returned to the professional level to sign with FC Ternopil in the Ukrainian First League. His stint with Ternopil was short-lived as he was released two months later. In total, he would play in 4 matches in the second tier. 

After his release from Ternopil, he returned to his former club Lozuvatka Kryvyi Rih.

Canada 
In the summer of 2017, he went abroad to play in the Canadian Soccer League with FC Vorkuta. He assisted the club in securing the First Division title in his debut season. In his second season with Vorkuta, he assisted in securing the CSL Championship. 

After two seasons with Vorkuta, he was transferred to expansion franchise Kingsman SC for the 2019 season. He helped Kingsman secure a playoff berth when they defeated Vorkuta in the opening round of the competition. The club was eliminated from the playoffs in the next round by Scarborough SC. 

In 2022, he returned to the CSL, to sign with Toronto Falcons.

References

External links
FPL profile: Maksym Hramm

1991 births
Living people
Ukrainian footballers
Sportspeople from Kryvyi Rih
FC Dnipro players
FC Kryvbas Kryvyi Rih players
FC Hirnyk Kryvyi Rih players
FC Krystal Kherson players
FC Ternopil players
Association football midfielders
FC Continentals players
Canadian Soccer League (1998–present) players
Ukrainian First League players
Ukrainian expatriate footballers
Ukrainian expatriate sportspeople in Canada
Expatriate soccer players in Canada
Ukrainian Second League players